In late 2015, incidents of sudden unintended acceleration (SUA) involving the Mitsubishi Montero Sport have been reported in the Philippines. 2nd Generation Mitsubishi Montero Sport and 3rd Generation of Mitsubishi Montero Sport 2016 to 2023 have Sudden Unintended Acceleration. Buyers believed that 3rd Generation of Mitsubishi Montero Sport that SUA issue was solve but 3rd Generation the new model of Mitsubishi Montero Sport have sudden unintended acceleration. Concerns regarding the safety of the car model were raised and several class action lawsuits against Mitsubishi Motors Philippines were filed.

The incident has since been the subject of an investigation by the Department of Trade and Industry (DTI). There are also several sudden unintended acceleration incidents involving 2009 to 2011 Montero that date way back in the year 2010 to 2012. However, no such incidences have surfaced in other countries.

At least 23 SUA incidents involving Montero Sports were recorded by the Philippine National Police Highway Patrol Group, from motorists in Metro Manila, Cavite, Batangas, Iloilo City, Laguna and Tacloban.

Mitsubishi has asserted that the vehicles are safe to use and any sudden acceleration claims were of no basis; The company however offered a free inspection for Montero owners affected by the incident.

Notable incidents
 On September 13, 2014, during the funeral procession of the remains of former Ilocos Norte vice governor Mariano Nalupta, Jr., a Montero Sport (owned by the bereaved family of Nalupta), suddenly went out of control and hitting 13 people who are part of the procession, the incident was resulting of two casualties and 11 injured persons, including board member Ria Christina Fariñas, daughter of Congressman Rodolfo Fariñas.
 On July 15, Bishop Noel Alba Pantoja's wife was nearly killed when the vehicle fell into a  ravine upon accelerating on a dangerous curved road. 
 September 7, 2015 — In Quezon City, a Montero suddenly runs into reverse then forward, resulting in destroying the three motorcycles and two cars.
 Another incident on November 10, 2015 when engineering student Epi Cruz stated on his Facebook that his father suddenly hurls his car, Montero, claiming that he didn't step on the accelerator. The car lost control even though the brakes were applied. The car eventually capsized after avoiding a nearby bystander.
 November 10, 2015 — A gas station's CCTV captured the Montero being flipped into the vacant lot.
 In December 2015, a Montero Sport ploughed several concrete barriers on the Skyway Stage 3 construction on Araneta Avenue in Tatalon, Quezon City.
 On December 7, in Iloilo City, an owner of a Montero Sport saw his vehicle suddenly accelerated and ploughed his house's dining room.
 On December 21, 2017, ABS-CBN News reporter Doris Bigornia and her cameraman were involved in the accident with a Montero.
On  March 17, 2021, Landbank Muñoz, Quezon City branch was ploughed by a white Mitsubishi Montero driven by Esther Peralta.
On October 5, 2022, De La Salle University Dasmarinas School in parking area, the White Mitsubishi Montero Sport Black Series 2022 has Sudden Unintended Acceleration driven by Minerva Gabito and she accidentally hit the Red Old Model of Mitsubishi Montero Sport because of Sudden Unintended Acceleration.

Investigation
Initially, the DTI has not ordered any recall of Montero Sport models following its two-week investigation on the alleged SUA incidents. In 2017 the agency has ordered a recall on all automatic transmission variants of the vehicle manufactured between 2010 and 2015, but has since clarified that the recall order was not yet final and executory.

Other reactions
Bayan Muna representatives Neri Colmenares and Carlos Isagani Zarate blamed the incidents on the Department of Trade and Industry's failure to conduct safety inspections on the vehicles in question.

In light of the incidents, Mitsubishi Motors Philippines has asserted that the Montero Sport is safe to use, and any claims of sudden acceleration are devoid of any basis.

Quezon City Rep. Winnie Castelo, the current chairman of Metro Manila development committee urged Mitsubishi Motors to recall all its defective Montero models until the investigation of the DTI have been concluded.

The incident inspired numerous parodies and satirical reactions, among them a mobile app entitled "SUA Your Face", in reference to Montero owners adopting the hashtag #SUAyourface as a response to the incidents' notoriety in Philippine media.

See also
2009–11 Toyota vehicle recalls

References

2015 in the Philippines
2015 scandals
Montero sudden acceleration incidents
2015 in transport
Automotive safety